The South Carolina Gamecocks men's golf team represents the University of South Carolina and competes in the Southeastern Conference in Division I of the NCAA. Major team victories include the 1964 ACC Championship, the 1991 Metro Conference Championship, and the 2007 NCAA West Regional Championship. The Gamecocks also had runner-up finishes in the 1968 ACC Championship; the 1984, 1986, 1988, 1989, and 1990 Metro Conference Championships; and the 1998, 2008, 2013, and 2015 SEC Championships.  Under the guidance of head coach Bill McDonald, the South Carolina men's golf program has won or shared 21 tournament titles and made seven NCAA championship appearances. Last season the Gamecocks finished ninth at the NCAA Championship and matched the school record of nine top-five finishes in 12 events, including three tournament wins.

Coaches
 Bill McDonald - Head Coach
 Ben Dietrich - Assistant Coach

Former head coaches
 Puggy Blackmon (1995-2007)
GCAA Hall of Fame, 2004
 Steve Liebler (1987-1995)
 Bobby Foster (1977-1987)
 South Carolina Golf Hall of Fame, 2010

Conference history
The University of South Carolina left the ACC in 1971, following numerous disputes over the ACC's recruiting regulations and the political dominance of the conference's four North Carolina schools.  USC then competed as an independent until 1983 when it joined the Metro Conference for all sports except football and men's soccer.  In 1991, the Gamecocks joined the SEC when it increased its membership to 12 schools.

Notable wins and honors
 Mark Anderson
 2005 Schenkel E-Z-Go Invitational
 2005 SEC Freshman of the Year
 2005 & 2008 All-American
 George Bryan
 2008 Schenkel E-Z-Go Invitational
 2010 SEC Championship Runner-Up
 2007, 2009 & 2010 All-American
 Golf Channel "Big Break" Contestant
 Michael Christie
 1992 All-American
 Eric Ecker
 1998 SEC Championship
 1998 & 1999 All-American
Dykes Harbin
2012 Southeastern Amateur 
2012 AutoTrader.com Collegiate Classic
 Webb Heintzelman
 1984 All-American
 Mike Holland
 1976 South Carolina Amateur
 1978 All-American
 South Carolina Golf Hall of Fame, 2006 
 Jeff Hull
 1989 All-American
 Eirik Johansen 
 2003 & 2006 All-American
 Steve Liebler
 1979 Guilford College Invitational
 1980 Andy Bean Intercollegiate
 1981 Southeastern Intercollegiate
 1981, 1994 & 2011 Eastern Amateur
 1980 & 1981 All-American
 Will Murphy
 2014 Azalea Invitational
 2014 Sunnehanna Amateur
 2014 All-American
 Matthew NeSmith
 2012 Azalea Invitational
 2013 SEC Freshman of the Year
 2013 All-American
 2015 Hootie at Bulls Bay Intercollegiate
 2015 SEC Championship
 Carl Paulson
 1991 Metro Conference Championship
 1991 LSU National Invitational
 1993 Billy Hitchcock Intercollegiate
 1993 Ping Intercollegiate
 1993 SEC Player of the Year
 1993 All-American
 Allen Powers
 1967 South Carolina Intercollegiate
 1967 Palmetto Intercollegiate
 1968 All-American
 1982 South Carolina Amateur
 South Carolina Golf Hall of Fame, 1996
 Brett Quigley
 1989 Metro Conference Tournament Runner-Up
 1991 All-American
 David Seawell
 1994, 1995 & 1996 All-American
 Mark Silvers
 2009 SEC Scholar-Athlete of the Year
 2009 All-American
 Will Starke
 2014 Seahawk Intercollegiate 
 Caleb Sturgeon
 2012 Wendy's Kiawah Classic
 2014 Badger Invitational
 Kyle Thompson
 1997 Palmetto Classic
 1999 Seminole Classic
 1999 NCAA East Regional
 2000 Carpet Capital Collegiate
 2001 NCAA West Regional
 1999, 2000 & 2001 All-American
 David Tolley
 1982 U.S. Amateur Runner-up
 1984 All-American
 Fred Wadsworth
 1984 Imperial Lakes Invitational
 1984 Eastern Amateur
 1984 Gamecock Invitational
 1984 All-American
 Rick Williams
 1988 Wolfpack Invitational
 1989 Palmetto Invitational
 1990 Metro Conference Championship
 1990 All-American

Gamecocks on the European Tour
 Florian Fritsch
 Eirik Johansen
 James Morrison
 2010 Madeira Islands Open BPI - Portugal

Gamecocks on the PGA Tour
 Mark Anderson
 2013 BMW Charity Pro-Am
 Wesley Bryan
 2017 RBC Heritage
 2016 Chitimacha Louisiana Open
 2016 El Bosque Mexico Championship
 2016 Digital Ally Open
 2016 Web.com Tour Player of the Year
 Michael Christie
 1995 Nike Carolina Classic
 1996 Nike Greater Greenville Classic
 1996 Nike Permian Basin Open
 1996 Nike Utah Classic
 Mike Holland
 1981 Walt Disney World National Team Championship with Vance Heafner
 Steve Liebler
 Carl Paulson
 1995 PGA Tour Qualifying Tournament - medalist
 1999 Nike Utah Classic
 1999 Nike Boise Open
 Brett Quigley
 1996 NIKE Philadelphia Classic
 2001 BUY.COM Arkansas Classic
 Kyle Thompson
 2007 Rex Hospital Open
 2007 Oregon Classic
 2011 Rex Hospital Open
 Fred Wadsworth
 1986 Southern Open
 1989 South African Open

References